A tree of virtues (arbor virtutum) is a diagram used in medieval Christian tradition to display  the relationships between virtues, usually juxtaposed with a tree of vices (arbor vitiorum) where the vices are treated in a parallel fashion.
Together with  genealogical trees, 
these diagrams qualify as among the earliest explicit tree-diagrams in history, emerging in the High Middle Ages.

At first appearing as illustrations in certain theological tracts, the concept becomes more popular in the Late Middle Ages and is also seen in courtly manuscripts such as the psalter of Robert de Lisle (c. 1310-1340).

The nodes of the tree-diagrams are the Cardinal Virtues and the Cardinal Vices, respectively, each with a number of secondary virtues or secondary vices shown as leaves of the respective nodes.
While on a tree of virtues, the leaves point upward toward heaven, on a tree of vices the leaves point downward toward hell.
At the root of the trees, the virtues of humilitas "humility" and the vice of superbia "pride" is shown as the origin of all other virtues and vices, respectively. 
By this time, the concept of showing hierarchical concepts of medieval philosophy in diagrams also becomes more widespread. E.g. ms. Arsenal 1037 (14th century)  has a tree of virtue on fol. 4v and a tree of vices on fol. 5r as part of a collection of diagrams on a variety of topics. In this example, the trees are also further subdivided into a ternary structure, as follows:
humilitas radix virtutum
I. prudentia (seven sub-virtues)
II. fortitudo (seven sub-virtues)
semita vitalis
III. iustitia (seven sub-virtues)
IIII. temperantia (seven sub-virtues)
fructus spiritus
V. fides (seven sub-virtues)
VI. spes (seven sub-virtues)
VII. caritas (seven sub-virtues)
superbia radix vitiorum
I. avaritia (seven sub-vices)
II. invidia (seven sub-vices)
semita mortis
III. inanis gloria (seven sub-vices)
IIII. ira (seven sub-vices)
fructus carnis
V. gula (seven sub-vices)
VI. acedia (seven sub-vices)
VII. luxuria (seven sub-vices)

In the Italian Renaissance, Pietro Bembo developed a similar flow-chart-like "moral schema" of sins punished in Dante's Inferno and Purgatory.

See also
Seven Virtues
Seven Cardinal Sins
Works of Mercy
Tree of Jesse

References

Serenus de Cressy, Arbor virtutum or, An exact modell in the which are represented all manner of vertues and graces
Michael W. Evans, "§3.5 Arbor virtutum" in The Geometry of the Mind (1980)
A. Watson, "The Speculum Virginum with Special Reference to the Tree of Jesse", Speculum 3.4, October 1928, 445-469.

External links 
 
 15th-century painted mural 'Tree of vices' as the seven-headed dragon of the Apocalypse of St. John (Rev. 12) at Anglican parish church of St Ethelbert’s, Hessett, Suffolk, England  
 The Seven Virtues and Fifty Subvirtues of Medieval Christianity 
Medieval culture
Christian ethics
Virtue